The European and African Zone is one of the three zones of regional Davis Cup competition in 2008.

In the European and African Zone there are four different groups in which teams compete against each other to advance to the next group.

Participating teams

Draw

Luxembourg, Greece, Morocco, and Tunisia relegated to Group III in 2009.
South Africa and Ukraine promoted to Group I in 2009.

First Round Matches

Luxembourg vs. Denmark

Finland vs. South Africa

Algeria vs. Hungary

Monaco vs. Greece

Ukraine vs. Egypt

Ireland vs. Morocco

Cyprus vs. Slovenia

Portugal vs. Tunisia

Play-offs

Finland vs. Luxembourg

Greece vs. Hungary

Egypt vs. Morocco

Tunisia vs. Slovenia

Second Round Matches

South Africa vs. Denmark

Monaco vs. Algeria

Ireland vs. Ukraine

Portugal vs. Cyprus

Third Round Matches

Monaco vs. South Africa

Ukraine vs. Portugal

References
Draw

Europe Africa Zone Group Ii
Davis Cup Europe/Africa Zone